The Kentucky Wildcats men's basketball team is an American college basketball team that represents the University of Kentucky. Kentucky is the most successful NCAA Division I basketball program in history in terms of all-time winning percentage (.765) and is number 1 in all-time wins. The Wildcats are currently coached by John Calipari.

Kentucky leads all schools in total NCAA tournament appearances (59), is tied in NCAA tournament wins (131) with North Carolina, NCAA Tournament games played (184), NCAA Sweet Sixteen appearances (45), NCAA Elite Eight appearances (38), total postseason tournament appearances (68), and are second in regular-season conference championships (53, of which 51 are Southeastern Conference (SEC) regular-season championships). Furthermore, Kentucky has played in 17 NCAA Final Fours (tied with Duke for third place all-time behind North Carolina and UCLA), 12 NCAA Championship games (tied for first all-time with North Carolina and UCLA), and has won eight NCAA championships (second only to UCLA's 11). In addition to these titles, Kentucky won the National Invitation Tournament (NIT) in both 1946 and 1976, making it the only school to win multiple NCAA and NIT championships. Kentucky also leads all schools with sixty-three 20-win seasons, sixteen 30-win seasons, and six 35-win seasons.

Kentucky was the first school to 1000 wins in 1968 and 2000 wins in 2009. From 1967 to 1990 and 1996 to 2022, Kentucky led all schools in all-time wins. Between 1990 and 1996 and since March 25, 2022, Kentucky has ranked second in all-time wins.

Throughout its history, the Kentucky basketball program has featured many notable and successful players, both on the collegiate level and the professional level. Kentucky holds the record for the most overall NBA Draft selections (128) and three Wildcats have been selected as the first overall pick (John Wall, Anthony Davis, and Karl-Anthony Towns). The Wildcats have also been led by many successful head coaches, including Adolph Rupp, Joe B. Hall, Eddie Sutton, Rick Pitino, Tubby Smith, and John Calipari. Kentucky is the only program with five NCAA Championship coaches (Rupp, Hall, Pitino, Smith, Calipari). Four Kentucky coaches have been enshrined in the Naismith Memorial Basketball Hall of Fame: Rupp, Sutton, Pitino, and Calipari. Former Wildcat players that have gone on to become head coaches include C. M. Newton, Pat Riley, Dan Issel, Dwane Casey, John Pelphrey, Scott Padgett, Steve Masiello, Mark Pope, and Travis Ford.

History

Early history (1903–1930)
During this early era Kentucky was unstable in that the school went through multiple coaches, most staying only one or two seasons.

Records indicate that the first head coach of the Wildcats was W. W. H. Mustaine, who in 1903 called together some students, took up a collection totaling $3 for a ball, and told the students to start playing. The first recorded intercollegiate game at the college was a 15–6 defeat to nearby Georgetown College. The team went 1–2 for their first "season", also losing to Kentucky University (later Transylvania University) but defeating the Lexington YMCA.

Through 1908, the team did not manage a winning season, and had an all-time record of 15–29. In the fall of that year a full-time head coach was hired, Edwin Sweetland. This made him the first paid coach in Kentucky's basketball history. That year, the team went 5–4, and only three years later, boasted their first undefeated season with nine victories and no losses. The 1914 team under Alpha Brummage, led by brothers Karl and Tom Zerfoss, went 12–2 and defeated all its Southern Intercollegiate Athletic Association opponents.

George Buchheit and the "Wonder Team" (1919–1925)
In 1919, George Buchheit became the new head coach of the Wildcats. An alumnus of the University of Illinois, he brought with him a new system of basketball. The "Buchheit system" or "Illinois system", focused on defense and featured one player standing under each basket, while three roamed the court. Buckheit varied the system he learned in Illinois in one important way. While the Illinois system employed a zone defense, Buchheit's system used an aggressive man-to-man scheme. On offense, he used a complicated system of passing called the "zig-zag" or "figure eight" offense.

Although the team had a losing season in Buchheit's first year, they won the first-ever Southern Intercollegiate Athletic Association tournament the next year, defeating the heavily favored Georgia Bulldogs. Both of these teams were composed entirely of native Kentuckians, anchored by All-American Basil Hayden. The tournament victory was considered Kentucky's first major success, and the 1921 team became known as the "Wonder Team."

In 1922, the team was unable to build on the success of the "Wonder Team." Although every player was eligible in 1922, two key players, Hayden and Sam Ridgeway, were injured before the start of the season. Hayden returned from his knee injury during the season, but was never able to play at the level he had the previous year. Ridgeway fought a year-long battle with diphtheria, and although he recovered, never played for the Wildcats again. The remaining three members of the "Wonder Team" went 9–5 for the season, and bowed out of the SIAA tournament in the second round.

C.O Applegran, Ray Eklund, and Basil Hayden (1925–1927)
Buchheit remained as coach through the 1924 season before moving on to coach Trinity College (later Duke University). A different coach would guide the team for each of the next four years. C.O. Applegran immediately followed Buchheit, and his 1925 team posted a respectable 13–8 record. Applegran in college had played for the University of Illinois, where he became an All-American. The next year, Ray Eklund led the team to a 15–3 record, and produced UK's second All-American, Burgess Carey. The record was enough for Kentucky to win their first regular season conference championship in the Southern Conference.

Seeing the cupboard largely bare for the upcoming year, Eklund resigned shortly before the start of the 1927 season. The team scrambled to find a new coach, and former player Basil Hayden left his coaching job at Kentucky Wesleyan College to answer the call. An inexperienced coach and a roster largely depleted of talent left the Wildcats with a 3–13 record that year. The disappointment convinced Hayden that he wasn't the "coaching type", and he resigned after the season. Fortunately for the Wildcats, 1927 would be their last losing season for six decades.

John Mauer and the "Mauermen" (1927–1930)
The Wildcats' new coach for the 1927–28 season was John Mauer. Although he had a talented group of players moving up from the junior varsity team, Mauer quickly discovered that his players did not know the fundamentals of the game. He began a regimen of three-hour practices five days a week during the preseason. The practice began with half an hour of shooting drills and usually ended with a full-court scrimmage. Between the two, Mauer worked on skill drills and scenarios. Mauer's teams were nicknamed the "Mauermen."

Teamwork was the hallmark of Mauer's system. Every player worked on every aspect of the game; there were no specialists. Like Buchheit, Mauer employed a strong man-to-man defense. He utilized a slow-break offense that relied on a complicated system of short passes to get a good shot. Two elements of Mauer's system were new to basketball in the south – the offensive screen and the bounce pass. The latter was so new to most of UK's opponents that it was referred to as the "submarine attack."

Over his three-year tenure, Mauer led the Wildcats to an overall record of 40–14. One major prize eluded him, however. Despite having teams that were almost universally acknowledged as the "class of the South", Mauer never led a team to the Southern Conference title. Despite his innate ability for coaching, Mauer lacked the ability to heighten his team's emotions for a big game, a fault that was cited as the reason for his lack of tournament success. Mauer left the Wildcats to coach the Miami University Redskins following the 1930 season.

Adolph Rupp (1930–1972)

In 1930, the university hired Adolph Rupp, who had played as a reserve for the University of Kansas 1922 and 1923 Helms National Championship teams, under coach Forest C. "Phog" Allen. At the time of his hiring, Rupp was a high school coach in Freeport, Illinois.

Rupp coached the University of Kentucky men's basketball team from 1930 to 1972. There, he gained the nicknames, "Baron of the Bluegrass", and "The Man in the Brown Suit". Rupp, who was an early innovator of the fast break and set offense, quickly gained a reputation as an intense competitor, a strict motivator, and a fine strategist, often driving his teams to great levels of success. Rupp's Wildcat teams won 4 NCAA championships (1948, 1949, 1951, 1958), one NIT title in 1946, appeared in 20 NCAA tournaments, had 6 NCAA Final Four appearances, captured 27 Southeastern Conference (SEC) regular season titles, and won 13 SEC tournaments. Rupp's Kentucky teams also finished ranked No. 1 on 6 occasions in the final Associated Press college basketball poll and 4 times in the United Press International (Coaches) poll. In addition, Rupp's 1966 Kentucky squad (nicknamed "Rupp's Runts", as no starting player on the squad was taller than 6'5") finished runner-up in the NCAA tournament, and his 1947 Wildcats finished runner-up in the NIT. Rupp's 1933 and 1954 Kentucky squads were also awarded the Helms National Championship, and his 1934 and 1947 teams were retroactively recognized as the national champion by the Premo-Porretta Power Poll.

The Beardless Wonders (1944)
One of Rupp's early successful teams, he would give the '44 team the nickname "the Beardless Wonders" and "Wildkittens" because according to Rupp, "It was like running a Kindergarten." Of the young players, Kentucky's best player was freshman Chad Anderson, who at the age of 17, would be named consensus All-American, making him the youngest player to ever earn the title. The Beardless Wonders would win 19 of their 21 games, enough to be invited into the NIT. There they would be matched up with an equally young and talented Utah team nicknamed the "Blitz Kids”.The game made for an exciting outing with both teams going into the half tied at 24, but with the help of Brannum Kentucky would pull away to win 46–38. Kentucky would lose the next game to home town Saint John's.

Kentucky's first championship (1948)

On the way to its first NCAA title, Kentucky would go on to a record of 36–3. Of these three losses, all were either away or at neutral sites, keeping Kentucky undefeated at home throughout the entire season. Kentucky started off the beginning of the season with a 7–0 record heading into their away game at Temple. However, Temple was able to give the Cats their first loss by one point, 60–59. Still, this loss was not enough to keep the Wildcats down, as they rolled off an 11-win streak before playing at Notre Dame, where they lost 55–64. They would not lose a game for the rest of the regular season. Kentucky continued through the NCAA tournament to the finals, where they faced the Baylor Bears. Kentucky won its first NCAA title in a decisive 58–42 victory. The season did not end after the NCAA tournament, as Kentucky who would play in the Olympic Trials, where they went 2–1, only losing to the Phillips Oilers once. This was performance enough to represent the United States in the 1948 Olympic Games. Despite only being a college team, the starting 5 of Kentucky would defeat all of its competition in London, making Kentucky the only team to win both an NCAA title and an Olympic gold medal. Adolph Rupp soon gave this team the nickname "The Fabulous Five", in honor of their accomplishments.

Back-to-back championships (1949)
For the 1949 season Kentucky had high expectations with most of the Fabulous Five returning. Big Blue Nation's expectations were met as the 1949 team won one more game than the previous year including both a SEC regular season and SEC tournament championship, while also getting back to the Final Four that March. In the finals Kentucky faced the Oklahoma A&M Cowboys, a team that had previously seen success in the tournament with back-to-back championships in 1945 and 1946. The Fab Five would succeed again winning 46–36 and Kentucky's only back-to-back NCAA championship. Kentucky was the second program in NCAA history to win back-to-back championships (there have been six other schools since).

A new decade (1950)
With a returning star player like Bill Spivey, Kentucky hoped to carry their success into the new decade. All did not look well after the Wildcats lost their first game by 11 to Saint John's at home, but they would pull it together for the Sugar Bowl Tournament, which they won, beating NCAA runner-up Bradley. Heading into rival Tennessee now No. 2 Kentucky was looking at the beginning of a tough six away game stretch; and tough it was. After losing to Tennessee, Kentucky would struggle to chain two wins together, losing every other game. They would defeat their next 14 opponents, including getting revenge in SEC tournament championship over Tennessee. Heading into the post-season, No. 3 Kentucky would play a powerhouse CCNY team in the NIT, missing the NCAA tournament. The Wildcats were no match and were thrashed by the CCNY Beavers, 50–83. The same CCNY would go to win the NIT, and then the NCAA championship. They are the only team in college basketball history to accomplish this feat.

Third championship and point-shaving scandal (1951)
Coming off a successful but titleless 1950 season, the Wildcats continued their dominance into the new decade. Over the season Kentucky would defeat four top 10 teams, and would be ranked in the top 5 the entire season. And with only one loss heading into the SEC tournament it looked like Kentucky would once again claim both SEC championships and their dominance over their conference. Vanderbilt had a different idea however, and would knock off the top ranked Wildcats in the SEC tournament finals denying them an eighth straight SEC tournament title. Kentucky was determined to not repeat the result it had in the SEC tournament in the NCAA finals, where they defeated fourth ranked Kansas State 68–58.

Adolph Rupp was the head coach at Kentucky during the year of the point-shaving scandal of 1951. In 1945 former Kentucky football player Nick Englisis met Kentucky basketball legend Ralph Beard while the two played football at Kentucky. Englisis entered the gambling business when he left the football team in 1946, then approached three Kentucky basketball players Ralph Beard, Alex Groza, and Dale Barnstable with his associates in late 1948 about potentially point shaving (fixing the score of games) during the upcoming season in exchange for money. The three players agreed to point shave and successfully shaved points in several games during the 1948–1949 season until an effort to point shave caused the Wildcats to lose to the Loyola Ramblers in the National Invitation Tournament. Groza, Beard, and Barnstable attempted to win the game under the point spread but kept the score too close, allowing the Ramblers to win the game with an impressive performance at the end of the second half. Kentucky faced Villanova in their first game of the NCAA tournament following the loss to Loyola and the three players attempted to win over the point spread. When Groza, Beard, and Barnstable failed to win over the point spread, it caused Englisis to lose all of his money and ended the point shaving deals between Englisis and these three players. On October 20, 1951, Alex Groza, Ralph Beard, and Dale Barnstable were arrested for taking bribes from gamblers to shave points during several games including the National Invitation Tournament game against the Loyola Ramblers in the 1948–49 season.

At the conclusion of this scandal, a subsequent NCAA investigation found that Kentucky had committed several rule violations, including giving illegal spending money to players on several occasions, and also allowing some ineligible athletes to compete. As a result, the Southeastern Conference voted to ban Kentucky from competing for a year and the NCAA requested all other basketball-playing members not to schedule Kentucky, with eventually none doing so. As a result of these actions, Kentucky was forced to cancel the entire 1952–53 basketball season. Years later, Walter Byers, the first executive director of the NCAA, unofficially referred to this punishment as the first de facto NCAA death penalty, despite the current rule first coming into effect in 1985, thus the NCAA having no such enforcement power previous to that. Echoing Mr. Byers' view, the NCAA's official stance is very much the same, and they now state in hindsight, "In effect, it was the Association's first death penalty, though its enforcement was binding only through constitutional language that required members to compete against only those schools that were compliant with NCAA rules. Despite fears that it would resist, Kentucky accepts the penalty and, in turn, gives the NCAA credibility to enforce its rules."

Undefeated but no tournament (1954)
The team returned with a vengeance the next year, posting a perfect 25–0 record (Rupp's only undefeated season), for which it was awarded the 1954 Helms National Championship. In addition, Kentucky also finished ranked No. 1 in the final Associated Press poll. On the team were three players who had graduated at the conclusion of the previous academic year. When, at the last minute, the NCAA ruled these players ineligible from post-season play, Rupp decided to skip the 1954 NCAA Tournament in protest.

Rupp's fourth championship (1958)
Early into the season it was obvious that the "Fiddlin' Five" were not like Rupp's teams earlier in the decade. They played around and made mistakes, which Rupp described as fiddling. In fact the Fiddlin' Five still has the most losses out of any Kentucky's championships, with six, three of those were in four games. Unlike the Fab Five or the 1951 teams, the Fiddling Five would yoyo in the rankings with their lowest a No. 13 coming after 56–57 loss to unranked Loyola Chicago. Kentucky would catch fire through the tournament though and would win their fourth title over No. 18 Seattle in the confines of Louisville's Freedom Hall.

Rupp's Runts (1966)
Rupp's last Final Four team and one of his last chances at a 5th NCAA title occurred in the 1965–66 season, with Kentucky going all the way to the NCAA title game. The now historic 1966 NCAA championship game against Texas Western (now University of Texas-El Paso or UTEP) marked the first occurrence that an all-white starting five (Kentucky) played an all-black starting five (Texas Western) in the NCAA championship game. Texas Western won the game 72–65, on the night of March 19, 1966. Contrary to popular belief, this game was not a huge "upset" as while Kentucky entered the tournament with only one loss and ranked No. 1, Texas Western also had only one loss and entered the tournament ranked second.  Kentucky was a 6.5 point favorite in the game  The game was depicted in the film Glory Road.

This game, and the result of it, were especially significant as the game came at a time when the civil rights movement was coming into full swing around the country. In 1969, after actively recruiting black players for over six years (his first formal scholarship offer was to Wes Unseld in 1964), despite most of the other SEC teams threatening to boycott if a black player took the court), Rupp finally signed his first black player, Tom Payne, an athletic 7'-1" center out of Louisville. This ended the aspect of all-white Kentucky teams forever, and marked a new era with many notable black Kentucky basketball legends, including Jack Givens, Sam Bowie, Kenny Walker, Jamal Mashburn, Tayshaun Prince, Rajon Rondo, John Wall, Anthony Davis, and Karl Anthony Towns.

The late Rupp years (1967–1972)
The late Rupp years looked promising with Dan Issel's commitment to the Wildcats in 1966. Over the next four years Issel would score an average of 25.7 per game, adding up to 2,137 points in his college career. This made Issel the player with the most points to ever play at Kentucky, a feat that has not been matched to this day. This included his 53 points scored against Mississippi State in 1970, the most by a Kentucky player in a single game until Jodie Meeks made 54 against rival Tennessee on 2-13-09.Issel would not capture the national championship in his college years, but would go on to make a name for himself in the ABA.

After 1966 Rupp would see continued success, but the Final Four eluded him. The Wildcats would end with a 13–13 season and miss the tournament altogether in 1967, then reach the Elite Eight and Sweet Sixteen in the next two years. Sporting a senior Dan Issel, 1970 team looked to be truly special, perhaps one to dethrone the UCLA dynasty. Ranked #1 in the nation with a 26–1 record overall, Kentucky nearly missed a Final Four berth in a 106–100 shootout against Jacksonville.  
 
Rupp was forced into retirement in March 1972, after reaching age 70. At the time, this was the mandatory retirement age for all University of Kentucky employees. He was a 5-time National Coach-of-the-Year award winner, a 7-time Conference Coach-of-the-Year award winner, and was elected a member of both the Naismith Memorial Basketball Hall of Fame and College Basketball Hall of Fame. Further, since 1972, the Adolph Rupp Trophy, considered one of the nation's premier basketball awards, has been given by Commonwealth Athletic Club to the nation's top men's college basketball player. In addition, the University of Kentucky retired a jersey in his honor in the rafters of Rupp Arena, a 23,500-seat arena named after him, dedicated in 1976.

Joe B. Hall (1972–1985)

Joe B. Hall was the head basketball coach at Kentucky from 1972 to 1985. Although he had been an assistant at Kentucky since 1965, Coach Hall was given a difficult task: to follow in the footsteps of his legendary predecessor, Adolph Rupp. In the 1978 NCAA tournament, he coached the Wildcats to their fifth NCAA championship. He was named National Coach of the Year in 1978 and SEC Coach of the Year on four occasions. His record at UK was 297–100, and 373–156 over his career.
Coach Hall would win the title once in 1978 as well as making the final four in 1975 and 1984, and the elite eight in 1972, 1973, 1977, 1983.

Coach Hall is one of only three men to both play on an NCAA championship team (1949– Kentucky) and coach an NCAA championship team (1978– Kentucky), and the only one to do so for the same school. The only others to achieve this feat are:
Bob Knight – Player for Ohio State in 1960 and coach at Indiana in 1976, 1981, and 1987.
Dean Smith – Player for Kansas in 1952 and coach at North Carolina in 1982 and 1993.

The Super Kittens (1975)
After a year of playing in the freshman league and a disappointing sophomore season, Hall's Super Kittens returned with hopes of finally bringing Kentucky its fifth title. They nearly did just that, guiding Kentucky to a runner-up finish to UCLA in the 1975 NCAA tournament but not before avenging their 20-point defeat to an undefeated Indiana team. Despite losing in the championship game, it would give freshman Jack Givens a taste for success that would help propel Kentucky to the title three years later.

The Season Without Celebration and fifth championship (1978)
It had been 20 years without a championship in Lexington, and along with pressure of following a hall of fame coach, Hall would nickname the 1978 season the "Season Without Celebration." The pressure to win was immense on both players and coach to bring home the title, especially with a senior laden team that had gone to the finals as freshmen. Kentucky would hardly lose its composure all season or break under pressure, winning 30 of 32 games and defeating eight ranked teams along the way. By the time Kentucky reached the tournament finals they seemed bound to win the title, though Duke would give Kentucky their all. With the help of senior Jack "Goose" Givens' 41 points, Kentucky defeated the Blue Devils 94–88, and finally won their fifth title and first in 20 years.

Eddie Sutton (1985–1989)

Early Sutton era (1985–1988)
In 1985, Eddie Sutton succeeded Joe B. Hall. He coached the Wildcats for four years, leading them to the Elite Eight of the 1986 NCAA tournament. Two seasons later, Sutton and the 25–5 Wildcats captured their 37th SEC title and were ranked as the 6th college basketball team in the nation by the Associated Press and UPI before losing to Villanova in the Tournament.

Emery scandal (1989)
Kentucky entered the 1988–89 season with a gutted roster. Ed Davender, Robert Lock and Winston Bennett had all graduated from school, while All-SEC sophomore Rex Chapman left school early to enter the 1988 NBA draft. Additionally, sophomore standout Eric Manuel was suspected of cheating on his college entrance exam and voluntarily agreed to sit out until the investigation was finished. Potential franchise recruit Shawn Kemp transferred out of Kentucky after signing with the school early that year. Unfortunately, Manuel was forced to sit out the entire season as the investigation dragged on, essentially leaving the Wildcats in the hands of inexperienced sophomore LeRon Ellis and true freshman Chris Mills. The two underclassmen struggled to fill the talent vacuum on the court and the Wildcats finished with a losing record of 13–19, the team's first losing full-season record since 1927. To add insult to injury, the NCAA announced at the end of the season that its investigation into the basketball program had found the school guilty of violating numerous NCAA policies.

The scandal broke when Emery Worldwide employees claimed to have discovered $1,000 in cash in an envelope Kentucky assistant coach Dwane Casey sent to Mills' father. Later Emery settled a libel lawsuit filed by Casey for a substantial amount of money. Casey was not in Lexington when the envelope was supposedly mailed and the father of Mills said they received no money. The NCAA rescinded its show cause order immediately after the settlement of the lawsuit, and Casey's career has flourished as an NBA coach. Another player, Eric Manuel, was alleged to have received improper assistance on his college entrance exams and was banned from NCAA competition. Whether Manuel was directly involved has been questioned. Kentucky was already on probation stemming from allegations of an extensive scheme of payments to recruits, and the NCAA seriously considered hitting the Wildcats with the "death penalty", which would have shut down the entire basketball program (as opposed to simply being banned from postseason play) for up to two years. However, school president David Roselle forced Sutton and athletic director Cliff Hagan to resign. The Wildcats were slapped with three years' probation, a two-year ban from postseason play, the vacating of their two NCAA tournament wins in the 1988 season, and a ban from live television in 1989–90.

Rick Pitino (1989–1997)

Post season ban and rebuilding with the Unforgettables (1989–1992)
In 1989, Rick Pitino left the NBA's New York Knicks and became the coach at a Kentucky program reeling from the aforementioned scandal. Kentucky would be banned from the 1990 and 1991 post season, with the 1990 season suffering a 14–14 record. Kentucky would improve in 1991 with a beavy of home-grown upperclassmen such as Sean Woods, John Pelphrey, Richie Farmer, Deron Feldhaus, and Reggie Hanson along with the talented freshman Jamal Mashburn. Despite their record of 22–6, Kentucky was still banned from the post season and would have to wait another year to see the Unforgettables succeed in the tournament.

Beginning with the 1992 season, Kentucky was free of post season bans. Though they lost one more game than last season, this team was most memorable for going to the Elite Eight (for the first time since Sutton's 1986 team) with many returning upperclassmen from Kentucky. The team is also known for playing in what could be considered one of the greatest games in NCAA tournament history against Duke. In this game defending champion Duke were looking to return to the Final Four once again, Kentucky for the first time in almost a decade. The game was hard-fought and physical on both sides all game including Laettner's infamous stomp on Aminu Timberlake, which resulted in a technical. The teams took the lead back and forth until the final minute of the game which resulted in a first buzzer beater shot by Kentucky's Sean Woods to take the lead 103–102, and then Laettner's shot to win the game for the Blue Devils in the final seconds 104–103. This team came to be known as the "Unforgettables" for helping put Kentucky back on the path to success in the 1990s and because the team was made up of home grown Kentucky kids.

Return to the Final Four (1993)
Kentucky returned a junior Mashburn, along with Travis Ford and Tony Delk. They were expected to reach the Final Four for the first time since Joe B. Hall's 1984 team. The expectations were right, as Kentucky would head into the post-season with only 2 losses and a No. 5 ranking. After winning the SEC Tournament once again, Kentucky stormed to the NCAA Final Four to meet up with Michigan's "Fab Five" a team of young and highly talented recruits that brought Michigan to the championship game the year before. As talented as Kentucky was they would fail to reach the championship game with a 78–81 overtime loss to the Wolverines. But this would be the just a glimpse of a run Kentucky would have later in the decade.

The Mardi Gras Miracle (1994)
Kentucky started the next season ranked #1 but would underachieve, falling short of the Elite Eight for the only time under Pitino. The highlight of the season was the "Mardi Gras Miracle", a game where Kentucky trailed LSU 68–37 with 15:34 left, but outscored them 62–27 over the remainder of regulation to win 99–95.

The Untouchables and championship number six (1996)
Starting in 1996, Kentucky would put together a string of Final Fours with help from 9 future NBA players. The "Untouchables" as they were nicknamed, would only lose twice, to Final Four bound UMass Minutemen (coached by current Kentucky coach John Calipari) and Mississippi State. It was with their overwhelming talent and chemistry that would win Kentucky their sixth national title in the 1996 NCAA tournament, Kentucky's first NCAA championship in 18 years.

The Unbelievables (1997)
The following year, Pitino's Kentucky team made it back to the national title game,  losing to Arizona in overtime in the finals of the 1997 NCAA tournament. Pitino's fast-paced teams at Kentucky were favorites of the school's fans. It was primarily at Kentucky where he implemented his signature style of full-court pressure defense. By the end of the Pitino era, Kentucky went from banned from the post season to going to three of the last five Final Fours and five of the last six Elite Eights. For this the 1997 team was dubbed the "Unbelievables" for taking a team that was not expected much of to return the Wildcats back to the championship game for a second time.

Pitino left Kentucky in 1997 to coach the NBA's Boston Celtics, he then went on to coach Kentucky's in-state rival, the University of Louisville.

Orlando "Tubby" Smith (1997–2007)
Orlando "Tubby" Smith was introduced by UK Athletic Director C.M. Newton as the Wildcats' 20th head coach on May 12, 1997, charged with the unenviable task of replacing popular coach Rick Pitino. The Wildcats were at the top of the basketball world at the time, having won a national title in 1996 and, according to many, missing a second straight title in 1997 by the torn ACL of shooting guard Derek Anderson. (Anderson tore his ACL in January against SEC foe Auburn; Kentucky lost the 1997 title game in overtime to the Arizona Wildcats.) The team Smith inherited sported seven players from the Arizona loss, and five from the 1996 championship team. However, since most of the players who had left after the 1996 and 1997 seasons were high NBA draft picks, his team had the lowest pre-season ranking since Kentucky came off probation in 1991.

New coach and a seventh championship (1998)
In his first season at UK, he coached the Wildcats to their seventh NCAA championship, including a come-from-behind victory against Duke in the Elite Eight, and another comeback win against Stanford, then Utah in the Finals. His 1998 National Championship is unique in modern times, as being along with 1985 Villanova the 2nd team in over 20 years to win without a First Team All American or future NBA Lottery Pick (see 1998 NCAA tournament). The 1998 team was also unlike Kentucky's past two championship teams, often falling behind in games before roaring back to win rather than dominating their competition.

Smith's teams, known primarily for a ball line defense-oriented slower style of play coined "Tubbyball", received mixed reviews among Kentucky fans who have historically enjoyed a faster, higher-scoring style of play under previous coaches. Smith was also under pressure from Kentucky fans to recruit better players.

Final Four drought (1999–2007)
After leading Kentucky to one National Championship in 1998, Kentucky would complete a perfect 16–0 regular season conference record in 2003, win five SEC regular season championships (1998, 2000, 2001, 2003, 2005) and five SEC Tournament titles (1998, 1999, 2001, 2003, 2004). Smith led the Wildcats to six Sweet Sixteen appearances (1998, 1999, 2001, 2002, 2003, 2005) and four Elite Eight appearances (1998, 1999, 2003, 2005) in his ten seasons. He totaled 100 wins quicker than any other Wildcat coach before him except Hall of Famer Adolph Rupp, reaching the plateau in 130 games (John Calipari subsequently broke this record in 114 games). In 2003, he was named AP College Coach of the Year.

Although Smith compiled an impressive resume during his UK career, he came under considerable pressure from many UK fans, who believed that his failure to achieve even a single Final Four appearance in his last nine seasons was inadequate by UK standards. He was infamously dubbed "Ten Loss Tubby" by several disgruntled UK fans. Smith's Final Four drought is the longest of any coach in UK history, although Smith did come just a double-overtime loss short of another Final Four appearance in 2005. On March 22, 2007, Smith resigned his position of UK Head Coach to accept the head coach position at the University of Minnesota.

Billy Gillispie (2007–2009)
On April 6, 2007, Billy Gillispie was formally announced as the new head coach of the University of Kentucky by UK athletic director Mitch Barnhart. He fielded questions from the media during the press conference held at UK's new practice facility, the Joe Craft Center. He expressed his excitement and joy to be not only considered for the position but to have been given the honor and the opportunity to coach what former UK coach Rick Pitino referred to as the "Roman Empire" of college basketball. "I'm very, very grateful and honored to be here, but we have a lot of work to do." Gillispie became only the sixth head coach in the last 76 years at the school.

Decline in form (2008–2009)
Gillispie's second season again started out rocky in 2008 as the 'Cats fell to Virginia Military Institute in their season opener. The second game of the season saw the Wildcats fall to North Carolina by 19 points. UK rebounded to win 11 of their next 12 games, improving their record to 11–3. On January 4, the Wildcats lost a heart breaker to archrival Louisville 74–71 after a 25 ft. shot by Edgar Sosa with 2.3 seconds remaining in the game. Prior to the shot, UK was down 7 with 38.5 seconds left, and Jodie Meeks was fouled shooting a three, proceeded to make all three free throw shots, Patrick Patterson stole an inbound and passed it to Meeks who laid it in to bring the game to 71–69 with 29.6 left, and then an inbound pass went long and Meeks snatched the pass, drove to the hoop and was fouled, and then made both free throws to tie the game at 71 with 22.9 left. So all in all, UK and Meeks got seven points in about 15 seconds to tie the game. Kentucky disposed of Vanderbilt to win their SEC opener on January 10, 70–60. On January 13, in a road game against Tennessee, Jodie Meeks set a new Kentucky scoring record by dropping 54 points on the Volunteers. This total bested Dan Issel's 39-year-old scoring record by 1 point, and propelled UK to a 90–72 win and 2–0 start in conference play. Kentucky followed up this effort with a 68–45 victory at Georgia, improving to 14–4 on the season. With wins over Auburn and Alabama, Kentucky moved to 5–0 in the SEC. On January 26, UK was ranked in the AP Poll (24th) for the first time since week 1 of the 2007–08 season. UK promptly dropped 3 in a row (to Ole Miss, South Carolina, and Mississippi State) before rebounding at home with a thrilling 68–65 win over Florida. Jodie Meeks scored 23 points in the contest, including the fade-away contested 3-point basket with less than 5 seconds remaining to seal the win for UK. On Valentine's Day Kentucky handily defeated Arkansas at Bud Walton Arena 79–63 behind another strong performance from Meeks. Meeks contributed 45 points and helped UK win despite the absence of Patrick Patterson (sprained ankle). With the win, UK remained tied with South Carolina and Tennessee for 1st in the SEC East at 7–3. Following the win UK completely collapsed, losing 5 of its last 6 games to finish the regular season 19–12 with an 8–8 SEC record. Entering the SEC tournament many felt UK would need to win the championship game to get into the NCAA tournament, but UK was defeated in the second game vs. LSU. With an unimpressive regular season and quick elimination in the SEC tournament, UK did indeed miss the NCAA tournament for the first time in 18 years and instead received an invitation to the NIT tournament where the team was defeated in the quarterfinal round against Notre Dame.

On March 27, 2009, an 18-minute-long meeting occurred between Billy Gillispie, President Dr. Lee Todd, Jr. and Athletic Director Mitch Barnhart, after which it was announced that Gillispie would not be returning as the head coach the next season. Barnhart stressed the firing was due to more than wins and losses, citing "philosophical differences" and "a clear gap in how the rules and responsibilities overseeing the program are viewed".

John Calipari (2009–present)

Calipari's first class (2010)

On April 1, 2009, John Calipari replaced former head coach Billy Gillispie as the Wildcats head coach. To begin his tenure at the University of Kentucky, John Calipari signed one of the best all time recruiting classes. The class was headlined by four five-star recruits: John Wall, DeMarcus Cousins, Daniel Orton, and Eric Bledsoe. On December 19, 2009, the Wildcats defeated Austin Peay 90–69 extending their record to 11–0, and John Calipari broke Adolph Rupp's record for the most consecutive wins to start a season for a first-year head coach at Kentucky. Kentucky defeated the Drexel Dragons 88–44 on December 21, 2009, to become the first program in college basketball history to claim their 2000th victory. By January 25, 2010, Coach "Cal" had the Kentucky Wildcats ranked No. 1 in both the ESPN/Coaches poll and AP poll with a record of 19–0. Calipari helped raise in excess of $1.5 million to aid the country of Haiti during the aftermath of the 2010 Haiti earthquake. President Barack Obama called the Wildcats to thank them for their relief efforts and wish them luck in their future endeavors. To finish off the 2009–10 regular season, Kentucky won its 44th SEC regular season championship (with a final 14–2 SEC record), and won its 26th SEC tournament championship, beating Mississippi State in the finals. The Wildcats then received a No. 1 seed (their 10th No. 1 seed in history) in the East Regional of the NCAA tournament, where they eventually lost to West Virginia in the Elite Eight. This also marked Kentucky's record 50th NCAA Tournament appearance.

Run to the Final Four (2011)

In 2011 the Wildcats got off to a good start in the regular season with a record of 12–2, with their only losses being North Carolina away and UConn in the Maui Invitational Finals. Conference play was a different matter, and Kentucky would struggle in the SEC losing 6 out of their 8 away games, all of one were against unranked opponents. To close out the season with a three-game defeat No. 13 Florida, No. 23 Vanderbilt and Tennessee at home for a 22–8 record. The hot streak would continue and Kentucky would win their 27th SEC Tournament Title. This was enough for No. 4 seed on the East regional where they played Princeton in a very close first-round game that ended in a 59–57 victory for the Cats. Knight, Jones and company would exact their revenge in the second round against West Virginia, who knocked off Kentucky in the 2010 tourney. In the Sweet Sixteen and Elite Eight they would upset the No. 1 seed Ohio State Buckeyes and No. 2 seed North Carolina Tar Heels on their way to the school's 14th Final Four. They lost in the Final Four to eventual National Champion No. 3 seed UConn 56–55.

The road to an eighth championship (2012)

In the 2011–12 season, Calipari led Kentucky to being 16–0 in SEC regular season play, clinching its 45th SEC regular season championship. The last team to do so in the SEC was the 2002–03 Kentucky Wildcats, and before that, the 1995–96 Kentucky Wildcats. Kentucky's regular season record was 30–1, with its only loss being by one point coming from a 3-pointer buzzer-beater by the Indiana Hoosiers' Christian Watford at Assembly Hall on December 10, 2011. In the SEC Tournament, Kentucky fell to Vanderbilt in the championship game, making its overall record 32–2 going into the NCAA tournament. Kentucky was both selected as the No. 1 seed in the South Region and also the No. 1 seed overall of the entire NCAA Tournament. The Sweet 16 match-up on March 23, 2012, was a rematch against Indiana, in which this time the Wildcats prevailed over the Hoosiers 102–90. On March 25, 2012, Kentucky won the South Regional, setting up a Final Four semifinal with the Louisville Cardinals. Calipari's Wildcats defeated the Cardinals (coached by former Kentucky coach Rick Pitino) by a score of 69–61. This sent Kentucky to the National Championship game against the Kansas Jayhawks, where they defeated Kansas 67–59, winning UK's 8th NCAA championship, along with John Calipari's first NCAA Championship as a head coach. This Kentucky team had a record six players drafted in the 2012 NBA draft, including the first time two teammates have been chosen with the first two picks: Anthony Davis (1st overall), Michael Kidd-Gilchrist (2nd), Terrence Jones (18th), Marquis Teague (29th), Doron Lamb (42nd) and Darius Miller (46th).

Starting anew (2013)

The 2012–13 season's recruiting class ranked either first or second by various recruiting experts led by top center Nerlens Noel, guard Archie Goodwin, forward Alex Poythress, and four-star center Willie Cauley-Stein. Kentucky also brought in transfer guard Julius Mays, a graduate student who had previously played at Wright State University and North Carolina State. Mays was eligible to play immediately, because UK offered a master's degree program that Wright State did not. However, the only returner that saw significant minutes from the championship squad was back-up power forward Kyle Wiltjer, who averaged 11 minutes per game (Ryan Harrow sat out the previous season after transferring from NC State before the 2011–12 season). Although the team saw the rise of Jarrod Polson in the first game of the season against Maryland, they struggled to close out closer games and play with the will to win that Calipari demands. On February 12, Noel tore his ACL in a loss against Florida. UK was 17–7 including that game, and went 4–5 the remainder of the season, losing all 5 games away from Rupp Arena. The fourth of those losses was against Vanderbilt in the first round of the SEC tournament, and UK missed the NCAA tournament altogether, being the overall No. 1 seed of the NIT. UK was upset by Robert Morris in the first round of the NIT, ending their season with a 21–12 record.

In the press conference following the loss to Robert Morris, Calipari stated that his 2013–14 team would be a "tough, hard-nosed, fighting team." Noel and Goodwin both entered the NBA draft and were both taken in the first round at 6th and 29th, respectively. Ryan Harrow transferred to Georgia State to be closer to his father that had suffered from a stroke, and Kyle Wiltjer transferred to Gonzaga. Kentucky brought in the No. 1 recruiting class, featuring a record six McDonald's All-Americans in Julius Randle, Andrew Harrison, Aaron Harrison, James Young, Dakari Johnson, and Marcus Lee, as well as Kentucky natives Derek Willis and Dominique Hawkins, and walk-on E. J. Floreal (son of Edrick Floréal, head coach of UK's track and field team). Alex Poythress and Willie Cauley-Stein did not declare for the 2013 NBA draft, and decided to return for their sophomore seasons.

The Tweakables (2014)

In 2013–14, Kentucky looked to make up for its struggles in the previous season. Despite making the NIT, there were high expectations for this team. The team, however, would be without some of its top players from the 2012–13 team including Nerlens Noel and starting shooting guard Archie Goodwin, who were first-round draft choices in the 2013 NBA draft. Starting power forward Kyle Wiltjer transferred to Gonzaga and starting point guard Ryan Harrow transferred to Georgia State. Returning was former McDonald's All-American Alex Poythress and starting center Willie Cauley-Stein. The poor success of the 2012–13 team did not stop John Calipari from again producing another number one recruiting class. The entering class included a record six McDonald's All-Americans highlighted by Julius Randle and the Harrison Twins from Texas, Aaron and Andrew. Many recruiting analysts and experts proclaimed that the 2013 signing class was the greatest recruiting class since the infamous Fab Five in the 1990s.

The team began the season ranked number one in both the AP and Coaches polls. The season was full of ups and downs. Early in the season the team experienced close losses to Baylor, Michigan State, and North Carolina. Despite those losses the team was able to defeat in-state rival Louisville. Nothing changed in SEC play for them either. The team ended the regular season losing three of their last four games including once to South Carolina, who finished the season 14–20 overall. The team limped into the SEC tournament unranked, and desperately looking for any answer to their disappointing season. Calipari during his weekly radio call-in show mentioned the team was given a "tweak". The "tweak" sparked speculation and curiosity among the fans and the media to what it could be. The "tweak" was never fully revealed. However, the "tweak" caused the team to go on an historic run through both the SEC and NCAA tournaments. UK was the runner-up to number one Florida in the SEC Tournament. During the NCAA tournament UK became the first team in history to eliminate three teams from the previous Final Four (Wichita State, Louisville, Michigan). UK was the National Runner-up after losing to Connecticut in the national championship game.

Pursuit of perfection (2015)

After the 2014 season, Kentucky only lost Julius Randle and James Young to the NBA draft. The returning players consisted of a record-tying nine McDonald's All-Americans. Juniors Cauley-Stein and Poythress returned with sophomores Aaron and Andrew Harrison, Johnson, and Lee to join the No. 2 ranked 2015 recruiting class which was highlighted of Gatorade Player of the Year Karl-Anthony Towns for the 2015 season. The team began its season in the Bahamas on a six-game tour against international clubs and teams. While in the Bahamas the team established a "platoon system" which featured two groups of five players that would rotate every four minutes within the game. The "platoon system" was put on display nationally in a 72–40 victory over No. 5 Kansas in the Champions Classic in November. In December, the team defeated UCLA 83–44. Kentucky led 41–7 at halftime, the lowest UCLA point total for a half in its storied history. The SEC regular season began with two overtime victories over Ole Miss and Texas A&M, the closest games Kentucky would play all season. Kentucky finished the regular season with a perfect 31–0 record, the best start in school history. In the SEC tournament, the team won each game by double digits, including a 78–63 victory over Arkansas in the finals. Cauley-Stein was named the MVP of the Tournament. In the NCAA tournament Kentucky played its first two games at the KFC Yum! Center in Louisville. Prior to the regional semifinal against West Virginia, Mountaineers guard Daxter Miles proclaimed that Kentucky would be 36–1 after the game. The comment fueled the team as they defeated West Virginia 78–39, tying the largest margin of victory in the Sweet 16 in NCAA Tournament history. In the regional final Kentucky narrowly defeated Notre Dame 68–66. The only loss of the season was in the Final Four to Wisconsin, who Kentucky defeated the previous season in the Final Four. The 2014–15 team tied the NCAA record for most wins in a season (38). After the season Cauley-Stein and Towns were named consensus All-Americans among other awards received.

Season by season results

Coaches

The Wildcats have had 22 coaches in their 112-year history. John Calipari is the current coach. He signed a lifetime deal with them on April 1, 2019. He will make about $8 million per year. To date, 6 Wildcats coaches have won the National Coach-of-the-Year award: Adolph Rupp in 1950, 1954, 1959, 1966, and 1970, Joe B. Hall in 1978, Eddie Sutton in 1986, Rick Pitino in 1990 and 1992, Tubby Smith in 1998, 2003, and 2005, and John Calipari in 2012 and 2015. Additionally, 7 Wildcats coaches have been named Southeastern Conference Coach-of-the-Year: Adolph Rupp in 1964, 1966, 1968, 1969, 1970, 1971 and 1972, Joe B. Hall in 1973, 1975, 1978 and 1983, Eddie Sutton in 1986, Rick Pitino in 1990, 1991 and 1996, Tubby Smith in 1998, 2003, and 2005, Billy Gillispie in 2008, and John Calipari in 2010, 2012, and 2015.

Postseason results

National championships
The following is a list of Kentucky's 8 National Championships:

Final Four history

NCAA Tournament seeding history
The NCAA began seeding the tournament with the 1979 edition.

The * represents overall number one seed which began with the 2004 Tournament.

Honorees
Kentucky has 42 men's basketball players, coaches, and contributors honored in Rupp Arena with banners representing their numbers hung from the rafters. Due to the number of players honored, the fact that several of them have shared numbers, and NCAA rules requiring players to only wear jersey numbers containing digits 0 thru 5, the numbers are not officially retired. To have a banner hung, the individual must be elected to the UK Athletics Hall of Fame.

Honored players

Honored coaches

Honored contributors

All-Time statistical leaders

Awards

National Coach of the Year
 Adolph Rupp – 1950, 1954, 1959, 1966, 1970, 1978
 Eddie Sutton – 1986
 Rick Pitino – 1990, 1991
 Tubby Smith – 1998, 2003, 2005
 John Calipari – 2010, 2015

SEC Coach of the Year
 Adolph Rupp – 1964, 1966, 1968, 1969, 1970, 1971, 1972
 Joe B. Hall – 1973, 1975, 1978, 1983
 Eddie Sutton – 1986
 Rick Pitino – 1990, 1991, 1996
 Tubby Smith – 1998, 2003, 2005
 Billy Gillispie – 2008
 John Calipari – 2010, 2012, 2015, 2020

National Player of the Year
 Forest Sale – 1933
 Leroy Edwards – 1935
 Jack Givens – 1978
 John Wall – 2010
 Anthony Davis – 2012
 Oscar Tshiebwe - 2022

SEC Player of the Year
 Pat Riley – 1966
 Tom Parker – 1972
 Kevin Grevey – 1973, 1975
 Kyle Macy – 1980
 Kenny Walker – 1985, 1986
 Jamal Mashburn – 1993
 Tony Delk – 1996
 Ron Mercer – 1997
 Tayshaun Prince – 2001
 Keith Bogans – 2003
 John Wall – 2010
 Anthony Davis – 2012
 Tyler Ulis – 2016
 Malik Monk – 2017
 Immanuel Quickley - 2020
 Oscar Tshiebwe - 2022

National Freshman of the Year
 John Wall – 2010
 Anthony Davis – 2012

SEC Rookie of the Year
 Patrick Patterson – 2008
 DeMarcus Cousins – 2010
 Terrence Jones – 2011
 Anthony Davis – 2012
 Nerlens Noel – 2013
 Julius Randle – 2014
 Karl-Anthony Towns – 2015
 Malik Monk – 2017
 Kevin Knox - 2018

                                                                                                                                                        
NCAA Tournament MOP's
 Alex Groza – 1948, 1949
 Jack Givens – 1978
 Tony Delk – 1996
 Jeff Sheppard – 1998
 Anthony Davis – 2012

SEC Tournament MVPs
 Kyle Macy – 1979
 Dirk Minniefield – 1982
 Rex Chapman – 1988
 Jamal Mashburn – 1992
 Travis Ford – 1993, 1994
 Antoine Walker – 1995
 Ron Mercer – 1997
 Wayne Turner – 1998
 Scott Padgett – 1999
 Tayshaun Prince – 2001
 Keith Bogans – 2003
 Gerald Fitch – 2004
 John Wall – 2010
 Darius Miller – 2011
 Willie Cauley-Stein – 2015
 Tyler Ulis – 2016
 De'Aaron Fox – 2017
 Shai Gilgeous-Alexander - 2018

Naismith Hall of Fame Members
The following Kentucky players, coaches, and contributors have been enshrined in the Naismith Memorial Basketball Hall of Fame.

Olympians
The following Kentucky players and coaches have represented their country in basketball in the Summer Olympic Games:

Wildcats in the NBA

Though he never played a game at Kentucky, Enes Kanter (now Enes Kanter Freedom) did attend the university for one full academic year as a foreign exchange student from the University of Turkey at Gyro. He also was a part of the men's basketball team as a student assistant after the NCAA announced he was ineligible.

Memorable teams
The Wonder Team: Despite coming off a losing season Coach Buchheit and Kentucky's first All-American Basil Hayden would help a complete turn around in the 1920–21 season. Kentucky finished the season 13–1 and tasted their first post season success by winning the Southern Intercollegiate Athletic Association conference title.
The Mauermen: Coach John Mauer took over the program prior to the 1927–28 season, building a team that would go by the Mauermen. These Mauermen became well known for being well rounded and team oriented as well as having sound fundamentals. By the time John Mauer left after the 1930–31 season, he had compiled a 40–14 record at Kentucky (.740). However, Kentucky could not break through in the postseason during Mauer's tenure, and thus, did not win any Southern Conference titles from 1928 to 1930.
The Fabulous Five: The 1947–48 team not only won the NCAA title, but provided the core of the United States 1948 Olympic team that won the gold medal in the London Games. A year later in the 1948–49 season, this nearly the same team would win back-to-back NCAA Championships, making Kentucky only the second team to repeat as NCAA Champions after Oklahoma A&M.
The 1951 Team: The 1950–51 team, under the guidance of players such as Cliff Hagan and Bill Spivey, Kentucky would gain a record of 32–2, and 14–0 in the SEC. They would then go on to win Kentucky its 3rd title in only four years.
The Undefeated Team: The 1953–54 team, which went 25–0 in the regular season and defeated LSU in a playoff to earn the Southeastern Conference bid to the NCAA tournament. However, several of the team's players had technically graduated during the 1952–53 season and were prohibited from tournament play the following year. Despite the wishes of the players, Rupp refused to allow the team to play in the tournament, thus leading to the team's reputation as one of the best teams ever to fail to win an NCAA title.
The Fiddlin' Five: The 1957–58 team was given its nickname by Rupp due to his perception that they tended to "fiddle" early in games. However, they would right their ship in time to give Rupp his 4th and last national title.
Rupp's Runts: The 1965–66 team, with no starter taller than 6'5", was arguably the most beloved in UK history. Despite its lack of size, it used devastating defensive pressure and a fast-paced offense to take a 27–1 record and top national ranking into the NCAA final against Texas Western. However, the Miners would deny Rupp another title. For more details on the game, see the articles for Rupp and the Miners' coach, Don Haskins. Future NBA coach and Hall-of Famer Pat Riley was a starter on this team. So was ABA and NBA star Louie Dampier. Both players were named All-Americans in 1966. Sportscaster Larry Conley was also a starter, along with Tom Kron and Thad Jaracz. All five starters were All-SEC selections in 1966.
The season without celebration: Going into the 1977–78 season, the Wildcats faced perhaps the most suffocating expectations of any UK team. As freshmen, that year's senior class lost in the 1975 final to UCLA in John Wooden's final game as the Bruins' head coach. The seniors had an outstanding supporting cast, and most Kentucky fans would have accepted nothing less than a national title. Despite its successful run to the title, the team was widely criticized, especially by its own fans, for being too serious and focused, giving rise to the "season without celebration" moniker. Much of the criticism was directed at Head Coach Joe B. Hall, who felt under tremendous pressure from fans and boosters to win Kentucky's 5th championship, and did not let up in his quest.
 The Unforgettables: The 1991–92 team made up of mostly local players who had stayed behind after a scandal two years before is credited with reestablishing UK basketball in the 1990s. Despite a lack of a height they scrapped their way to a 29–7 record and SEC regular season and tournament championships. They played arguably the greatest college game ever played against Duke in the East Regional final 1991–92 Kentucky Wildcats men's basketball team
 Mardi Gras Miracle: Although the 1993–94 season would be quite a disappointment in terms of the NCAA tournament (only non-probation year Pitino failed to take the Cats to at least the Elite Eight), this season is best known for the Wildcats' 31-point comeback at LSU. Down 68–37 with less than sixteen minutes left in the game, Kentucky outscored LSU 62–27 to win 99–95 in one of the greatest comebacks in NCAA basketball history.
The Untouchables: The 1995–96 team was arguably the most talented team in Kentucky basketball history, and quite possibly in NCAA history, with nine players who would eventually play in the NBA:
Derek Anderson
Tony Delk
Walter McCarty
Ron Mercer
Nazr Mohammed
Mark Pope
Jeff Sheppard
Wayne Turner
Antoine Walker
This team became the first SEC team in 40 years to go through SEC regular season undefeated. Kentucky would repeat this feat in the 2002–03, 2011–12, and 2014–2015 seasons. After losing in the SEC Tournament final against Mississippi State, Kentucky would make a dominating run to the Final Four. They avenged an early-season loss to UMass in the NCAA National semifinals, and then defeated Syracuse in the NCAA Championship game to win their 6th championship. Many of the players on this great Kentucky team returned the following season.

The Unbelievables: The 1996–97 team just missed repeating as NCAA Champions when they lost to Arizona in overtime in the NCAA Championship game. The nickname comes from the fact that early on in the season, very few UK fans (or the media) gave Kentucky much of a chance of repeating on the feats of the previous 1995–96 season. This nickname also gained in importance as the team only had 8 available players for the 1997 NCAA Tournament, which was largely due to injury, NBA draft picks, and transfers.
The Comeback Cats: The 1997–98 NCAA national champions. This was new head coach Tubby Smith's first year at Kentucky, and the team truly earned this nickname in their last three games. In the South Regional final against Duke, they gained some measure of payback for Kentucky's heartbreaking 1992 defeat to Duke, with UK coming back from a 17-point deficit with 9:38 remaining. In the national semifinal, they came back from a double-digit halftime deficit again, this time against Stanford. In the NCAA Finals against Utah, they became the first team to come back from a double-digit halftime deficit in an NCAA Finals Game. 1997–98 would be Kentucky's 7th championship.
The Draft Cats: The 2009–10 team just missed the Final Four when they lost to West Virginia in the Elite Eight. The name comes from the 2010 NBA draft when they set a record with five players being drafted from the same school in the first round. These players were: 
John Wall (1st selection)
DeMarcus Cousins (5th)
Patrick Patterson (14th)
 Eric Bledsoe (18th)
Daniel Orton (29th).
The 8th Wonders The 2011–12 NCAA national champions, coached by head coach John Calipari, in his third year at Kentucky, earned this nickname due to their remarkable teamwork and overall quest for an NCAA Championship, and for being a team that started three freshman and two sophomores. For much of the season the team was ranked No. 1 in both the major polls, and also went undefeated in SEC regular season conference play (16–0). Kentucky stormed to the program's 8th NCAA tournament championship, winning their 6 NCAA Tournament games by an average of 10 points and never trailing in the second half. The team set an NCAA record with 38 wins in a season, and finished with a final ranking of No. 1 in both major polls. The team won Kentucky its 8th national championship with three one-and-done freshmen, and two sophomores that also declared for the NBA draft after the season. The team also set two new records for the NBA draft: the first time two players from the same school ever went as the first and second draft picks (No. 1 was Anthony Davis and No. 2 was Michael Kidd-Gilchrist), and the most players taken in a single two-round draft (six players): 
Anthony Davis
Michael Kidd-Gilchrist
Terrence Jones
Marquis Teague
Doron Lamb
Darius Miller
The Tweakables: This was the memorable 2013–14 team. After losing three of their last four regular season games the Wildcats were given little chance to accomplish much in the postseason. Prior to the SEC tournament, John Calipari announced that he had implemented a "tweak" to the team, which was later revealed to be encouraging Andrew Harrison to pass more. They defied their odds beating Louisiana State and Georgia to get to the finals for a rematch with the still top ranked Florida. Again defying odds they came one possession short of beating Florida. Despite this, Kentucky would receive an 8 seed in the Midwest, which included top seed and undefeated Wichita State, fourth seeded arch-rival and defending champion Louisville, second seeded Michigan, and third seeded Duke. Kentucky started their run by defeating Kansas State 56–49, setting them up with the Wichita State Shockers. In a shocking fashion Kentucky would defeat Wichita State by two points when Wichita missed its last shot (the second time in school history UK knocked off an undefeated team in the NCAA tournament; 1975 against Indiana was the other). Kentucky would then go on to beat instate rivals Louisville Cardinals in the Sweet Sixteen after Aaron Harrison hits a late three to put the Wildcats up 70–68 and hitting their last free throws to beat the defending champs. The next two games versus Michigan and Wisconsin would end in similar fashion with Aaron Harrison hitting late game threes to put the Wildcats in the Championship Game for the second time in three years. Marcus Lee would also have his break out game versus Michigan with four straight put-back dunks (and a total of ten points) and a block. Despite their run, they could not finish off Connecticut to win the title. This made them only the fifth 8 seed to make the Championship game. They are also one of the few teams that beat three out of the previous year's Final Four teams to get there (Wichita State, Louisville and Michigan).

Three point streak
The Wildcats had their streak of 1,047 consecutive non-exhibition games with at least one made three-point field goal end on March 15, 2018, in a 78–73 win over Davidson in the first round of the 2018 NCAA tournament. Three other schools (Vanderbilt, UNLV and Princeton) have longer such streaks, having made at least one three-point field goal in every non-exhibition game since the three-point field goal first came to the college game.

Facilities

Rupp Arena (1976–present)
The Kentucky Wildcats presently play their home games in 20,545-seat Rupp Arena. When it opened in 1976, it was the largest arena in the United States built specifically for basketball, and retained that status for much of the following 40-plus years. It was opened in 1976 and is named after legendary Kentucky head coach Adolph Rupp. Located off-campus, in downtown Lexington, the facility's official capacity was 23,500+ until a renovation project in the 2019 offseason reduced the capacity to 20,545. The Wildcats have consistently led the country in home attendance since the 1976–77 season (when Rupp Arena first opened), winning the National Attendance Title a record 25 times, including 17 of the past 20 seasons, and 8 of the last 10 seasons. Kentucky also has an impressive 529–64 (.892) all-time record in Rupp Arena.

Joe Craft Center (2007–present)
In 2007, the university unveiled the Joe Craft Center, a state-of-the-art basketball practice facility and athletics office building attached to the north side of Memorial Coliseum on the "Avenue of Champions" at the University of Kentucky campus in Lexington, Kentucky. The 102,000 ft² structure contains separate practice courts for the men's and women's basketball programs, separate men's and women's locker rooms, state-of-the-art video rooms for game film viewing, new coaches offices, a ticket office, and athletic administration offices.
As a result, Memorial Coliseum has more ample space for volleyball and gymnastics practice and games. The facility is named after businessman and philanthropist Joe Craft, a Hazard, Kentucky native, who pledged $6 million towards the completion of the $30 million project.

Memorial Coliseum (1950–76)
Coming off back-to-back national championships, the team moved to Memorial Coliseum in 1950. Nicknamed "The House That Rupp Built", the multipurpose facility cost $4 million and seated 12,000 people. It also housed a swimming pool, physical education equipment, and offices for the athletics staff. The team occupied Memorial Coliseum for twenty-six seasons, and sold out all 345 home games they played there during that period. Kentucky also played a 2009 NIT game at Memorial Coliseum due to Rupp Arena being booked. The Wildcats are 307–38 (.890) all-time at Memorial Coliseum. Today, Memorial Coliseum is home to three UK women's teams—basketball, gymnastics, and volleyball.

Alumni Gymnasium (1924–50)
In 1924, Alumni Gymnasium was completed. It included seating for 2,800 people and cost $92,000 to construct. Kentucky played 271 games at Alumni Gymnasium from 1924 to 1950, going 247–24 (.911). After a major renovation completed in 2018, it is now a student recreation facility known as Alumni Gym Fitness Center.

Woodland Park Auditorium (1914–16)
Woodland Park Auditorium, opened in 1906 and closed in 1941, was located on the corner of East High Street and Kentucky Avenue in Lexington, Kentucky. Kentucky used this facility for home games during World War I between 1914 and 1916 going 15–7 there all-time.

Buell Armory Gymnasium (1910–24)
The Wildcats played 84 home games at Buell Armory Gymnasium from 1910 to 1924. It was named for Union Civil War General Don Carlos Buell who was a member of the first board of trustees at Kentucky. The armory was also used during World War I to teach truck maintenance and repair among other skills. Kentucky was 59–25 all-time at Buell Armory Gymnasium.

State College Gymnasium (1902–14)
The first home court for the Wildcats was simply called "The Gymnasium" or State College Gymnasium until 1910. It was located in the north wing of Barker Hall on the university campus. Constructed in 1902, it also housed the university's physical education classes until 1909. The facility had a capacity of 650 people, and with no bleachers or seats, fans had to stand to watch the games that were played there. By the 1920s, it had become clear that "The Gymnasium" (by then renamed "The Ladies' Gym") was inadequate to house the university's basketball team. Records show Kentucky was 17–14 at State College Gymnasium.

Cumulative all-time statistics
 All Time Wins: 2353 (NCAA rank No. 2)
 All Time Winning Percentage: .765 (NCAA rank No. 1)
 NCAA Championships: 8 (NCAA rank No. 2)
 NCAA Championship Game Appearances: 12 (NCAA rank No. 1)
 NCAA Final Four Appearances: 17 (NCAA rank No. 2)
 NCAA Final Four Games Played: 28 (NCAA rank No. 3)
 NCAA Final Four Wins: 20 (NCAA rank No. 2)
 NCAA Final Four Winning Percentage: .715 (NCAA rank No. 8)
 NCAA Elite-8 Appearances: 38 (NCAA rank No. 1)
 NCAA Sweet-16 Appearances: 45 (NCAA rank No. 1)
 NCAA Tournament Appearances: 59 (NCAA rank No. 1)
 NCAA Tournament Games Played: 184 (NCAA rank No. 1)
 NCAA Tournament Wins: 131 (NCAA rank No. 1)
 NCAA Tournament Winning Percentage: .719 (NCAA rank No. 4)
 Total Postseason Tournament Appearances (NCAA and NIT): 63 (NCAA rank No. 1)
 NBA Draft Picks: 110 (NCAA rank No. 1)
 All-Americans: 57 (NCAA rank No. 1)
 All-American Total Selections: 87 (NCAA rank No. 1)
 First Team Consensus All-Americans: 20 (NCAA rank No. 2)
 First Team Consensus All-American Total Selections: 25 (NCAA rank No. 2)
 AP Poll Top-20/25 Weeks Ranked All Time: 825 (NCAA rank No. 2)
 AP Poll Top-10 Weeks Ranked All Time: 653 (NCAA rank No. 1)
 AP Poll Top-5 Weeks Ranked All Time: 441 (NCAA rank No. 1)
 AP Poll No. 1 Weeks Ranked All Time: 120 (NCAA rank No. 3)
 Final AP Poll Top-25 Finishes: 49 (NCAA rank No. 1)
 Final AP Poll Top-20 Finishes: 49 (NCAA rank No. 1)
 Final AP Poll Top-15 Finishes: 44 (NCAA rank No. 1)
 Final AP Poll Top-10 Finishes: 40 (NCAA rank No. 1)
 Final AP Poll Top-5 Finishes: 29 (NCAA rank No. 1)
 Final AP Poll No. 1 Finishes: 10 (NCAA rank No. 1)
 All Time Winning Percentage Against AP-Ranked Opponents: .615 (NCAA Rank No. 1)
 Final UPI/Coaches' Poll Top-25 Finishes: 47 (NCAA rank No. 1)
 Final UPI/Coaches' Poll Top-20 Finishes: 46 (NCAA rank No. 1)
 Final UPI/Coaches' Poll Top-15 Finishes: 43 (NCAA rank No. 1)
 Final UPI/Coaches' Poll Top-10 Finishes: 39 (NCAA rank No. 1)
 Final UPI/Coaches' Poll Top-5 Finishes: 30 (NCAA rank No. 1)
 Final UPI/Coaches' Poll No. 1 Finishes: 8 (NCAA rank No. 1)
 Total 20-Win Seasons: 59 (NCAA rank No. 1)
 Total 25-Win Seasons: 33 (NCAA rank No. 2)
 Total 30-Win Seasons: 14 (NCAA rank No. 1)
 Total 35-Win Seasons: 6 (NCAA rank No. 1)
 Average Victories Per Season Played: 19.4464285714(NCAA rank No. 3)
 Average Losses Per Season Played: 6.0 (NCAA rank No. 1)
 Total Winning Seasons: 95 (NCAA rank No. 2)
 Total Non-Losing Seasons (.500 or better): 98 (NCAA rank No. 2)
 Total Undefeated Seasons: 2 (NCAA rank No. 2)
 Total Head Coaches With an NCAA Championship: 5 (NCAA rank No. 1)
 Total Head Coaches With Multiple NCAA Championships: 1 (NCAA rank No. 2)
 Total Head Coaches With Multiple NCAA Championships in the Same Decade: 1 (NCAA rank No. 1)
 Total Head Coaches With an NCAA Championship Game Appearance: 5 (NCAA rank No. 1)
 Total Head Coaches With Multiple NCAA Championship Game Appearances: 4 (NCAA rank No. 1)
 Total Head Coaches With Multiple NCAA Championship Game Appearances in the Same Decade: 4 (NCAA rank No. 1)
 Total Head Coaches With an NCAA Final Four Appearance: 5 (NCAA rank No. 2)
 Total Head Coaches With Multiple NCAA Final Four Appearances: 4 (NCAA rank No. 2)
 Total Head Coaches With Multiple NCAA Final Four Appearances in the Same Decade: 4 (NCAA rank No. 1)
 Total Head Coaches With Both NCAA and NIT Championships: 2 (NCAA rank No. 1)
 Total Decades With an NCAA Championship: 5 (NCAA rank No. 1)
 Total Decades With Multiple NCAA Championships: 3 (NCAA rank No. 1)
 Total Decades With an NCAA Championship Game Appearance: 6 (NCAA rank No. 2)
 Total Decades With Multiple NCAA Championship Game Appearances: 5 (NCAA rank No. 1)
 Total Decades With an NCAA Final Four Appearance: 7 (NCAA rank No. 1)
 Total Decades With Multiple NCAA Final Four Appearances: 5 (NCAA rank No. 1)
 Total Decades No. 1 in Total Wins (since 1930): 1 (NCAA rank No. 2)
 Total Decades Top-5 in Total Wins (since 1930): 4 (NCAA rank No. 1)
 Total Decades Top-10 in Total Wins (since 1930): 7 (NCAA rank No. 1)
 Total Decades No. 1 in Winning Percentage (since 1930): 2 (NCAA rank No. 1)
 Total Decades Top-5 in Winning Percentage (since 1930): 6 (NCAA rank No. 1)
 Total Decades Top-10 in Winning Percentage (since 1930): 7 (NCAA rank No. 1)
 Conference regular season championships: 53 (NCAA rank No. 2)
 Conference tournament championships: 33 (NCAA rank No. 1)
 National Attendance Titles: 25 (NCAA rank No. 1)

(Of the 71 major categories listed above, Kentucky is No. 1 in 50 of them, No. 2 in 16 of them, No. No. 3 in 3 of them, No. 4 in 1 of them, and No. 8 in 1 of them.)

Kentucky can also lay claim to several individual achievements for both players and coaches:

 13 players winning NBA Championships a total of 20 times
 12 players named NBA All-Star a total of 23 times
 12 Olympic Gold Medal winners
 11 Naismith Hall-of-Fame members
 5 players named National Player-of-the-Year
 2 players named National Freshman-of-the-Year
 6 head coaches named National Coach-of-the Year a total of 14 times
 7 head coaches named SEC Coach-of-the-Year a total of 22 times
 138 players named All-Conference a total of 231 times
 82 players named to the All-Conference Tournament Team a total of 118 times
 12 players named Conference Player-of-the-Year a total of 14 times
 7 players named Conference Freshman-of-the-Year
 31 players named to the All-Conference Freshman Team
 15 players named Conference tournament MVP a total of 16 times
 18 players named All-NCAA Final Four a total of 21 times
 51 players named All-NCAA Regional a total of 65 times
 5 players named NCAA Final Four Most Outstanding Player a total of 6 times
 12 players named NCAA Regional Most Outstanding Player a total of 13 times
 74 players who played in the NBA at least one season
 60 1000-point scorers
 52 players named McDonald's All-American
 6 times being ranked No. 1 in the season opening AP Poll
 6 times being ranked No. 1 in the season opening UPI/Coaches' Poll 
 12 times a No. 1 seed in the NCAA tournament
 4 times being the NCAA official No. 1 overall seed in the NCAA tournament

Kentucky also holds several other NCAA records and various additional accomplishments:

 Kentucky has 2 NIT Championships (1946, 1976), 7 Helms Titles (1933, 1948, 1949, 1951, 1954, 1958, 1978), 2 undefeated seasons (1912, 1954), 5 Sugar Bowl tournament championships (1937, 1939, 1949, 1956, 1963), a league best all time SEC regular season record of 943–261 (.783), a league best 46 SEC regular season Championships, a league best all time SEC Tournament record of 124–25 (.832), and a league best 28 SEC tournament championships. Kentucky also holds the SEC's all time consecutive win streak among all past or present SEC schools at 38 straight victories, and is one of only 2 SEC schools to ever finish at 21–0 for the entire SEC season (18–0 record in the SEC regular season, plus a 3–0 record in the SEC Tournament).
 Kentucky holds the NCAA records for Consecutive Non-Losing Seasons (60), Consecutive Home Court Victories (129), for Total Victories in a Season (38), and for the best start for any season in NCAA Men's Basketball history at 38–0.
 Kentucky plays in the nation's largest basketball arena (Rupp Arena, capacity: 23,500), and has both the nation's largest radio and television affiliate networks.
 Kentucky has made a 3-point basket in 1013 consecutive games (leads the nation), and have won 17 of the last 20 National Attendance Titles, including 8 of the last 10, and 25 overall.
 Kentucky is the only school to have multiple NCAA (8) and NIT (2) Championships, the only school to have 5 NCAA Championship head coaches, the only school to have 4 coaches with multiple NCAA Championship Game appearances, the only school to have 4 coaches with multiple NCAA Championship Game appearances in the same decade, the only school to have 4 coaches with 3 NCAA Final Four appearances, the only school to win NCAA Championships in 5 decades, the only school to win multiple NCAA Championships in 3 decades, the only school to have NCAA Championship Game appearances in 5 decades, the only school to have multiple NCAA Championship Game appearances in 5 decades, the only school to have multiple NCAA Final Four appearances in 5 decades, the only school to have 2 head coaches win both NCAA and NIT Championships, and the one of only 2 schools to have 2 head coaches win an NCAA Championship in the same decade.
 Kentucky has played before the largest regulation basketball game crowd in history (79,444), the largest Final Four game crowd in history (79,444), the largest NCAA Championship Game crowd in history (79,238), and the largest total Final Four game crowd (both games) in history (158,682).
 Kentucky is the only school to have 5 players selected in the 1st-Round of the NBA Draft in the same year (2010), the only school to have both the No. 1 and No. 2 picks of the NBA Draft in the same year (2012), the only school to have 6 players drafted in the first 2 rounds of the NBA draft in the same year (2012, 2015), and the only school to sign 6 McDonald's All-Americans in the same year (2013).
 Kentucky was the first college program to reach both the 1000-win and 2000-win victory plateaus.
 Kentucky is the first team to be live-broadcast on the SEC Network.
 Kentucky is one of only three schools to have 9 McDonald's All-Americans on a single roster.
 Kentucky is the first school to hold an on-campus NBA Combine.

See also
 NCAA Division I men's basketball tournament consecutive appearances
 Florida–Kentucky men's basketball rivalry

References

External links
 

 
Basketball teams established in 1903
1903 establishments in Kentucky